USS SC-521 was a  that served in the United States Navy during World War II.  She was laid down on 5 May 1941 by the Annapolis Yacht Yard, Inc. in Annapolis, Maryland and launched on 1 February 1942.  She was commissioned on 15 April 1942.  She foundered on 10 July 1945 off Santa Cruz, Solomon Islands.

References
Submarine Chaser Photo Archive: SC-521
USS SC-521 (SC-521)

 

SC-497-class submarine chasers
Ships built in Annapolis, Maryland
1942 ships